Ron Bushy (December 23, 1941 – August 29, 2021) was an American drummer best known as a member of the rock band Iron Butterfly and as the drum soloist on the band's iconic song "In-A-Gadda-Da-Vida", released in 1968 although performed in the band's earlier appearances. Bushy was the only member of the group to appear on all six of its studio albums.

Career

Iron Butterfly
Previously playing in a band called the Voxmen, Bushy joined Iron Butterfly in 1966, following the band's relocation from San Diego to Los Angeles, replacing previous drummer Bruce Morse when he left due to a family emergency. Bushy became part of the group's classic lineup, along with vocalist and keyboardist Doug Ingle, guitarist Erik Brann, and bassist Lee Dorman.

After drumming on Iron Butterfly's first album Heavy in 1968, the band experienced substantial success with their song "In-A-Gadda-Da-Vida" from its second album, which shared the name, in which he played a lengthy and critically acclaimed drum solo. Bushy continued to play with Iron Butterfly on its third and fourth albums, 1969's Ball and 1970's Metamorphosis, until its break-up in 1971. He rejoined the group when the band reformed in 1974, playing on its fifth and sixth albums, Scorching Beauty and Sun and Steel, both released in 1975. He departed the group in 1977, and rejoined the next year.

Bushy continued to drum for Iron Butterfly on-and-off until its second break-up, in 1985. From Iron Butterfly's second reunion in 1987, he continued to drum with the group on-and-off as the most consistent member throughout various other member changes and break-ups.

Other bands
Magic (1977–1978): Bushy (drums) and Walter Kibbey (drums), Ron "Rocket" Ritchotte (guitar, vocals), former Iron Butterfly members Philip Taylor Kramer (bass, vocals) and Bill DeMartines (keyboards, vocals).

Gold (1978–1980): Bushy (drums), Ritchotte (guitar, vocals), whose spot was later filled by Stuart Young (guitar, vocals), John Koehring (guitar, lead vocals), and Kramer (bass, vocals). They recorded one album in the spring of 1979 that was never released.

Death
On August 29, 2021, Iron Butterfly issued a statement that Bushy had died that morning at the UCLA Medical Center in Santa Monica following a battle with esophageal cancer, at the age of 79. He is the third member of the In-A-Gadda-Da-Vida lineup to have died, following Erik Brann and Lee Dorman in 2003 and 2012 respectively, and leaving Doug Ingle as the only surviving member of that lineup.

References

External links
 
 
 Iron Butterfly official website
 Drumhead interview
 Everything 2
 Classic Bands
 Drum solo In-A-Gadda-Da-Vida 2012
 Ron Bushy at Find a Grave

American rock drummers
Musicians from Washington, D.C.
Iron Butterfly members
1941 births
2021 deaths
Burials at Mount Sinai Memorial Park Cemetery